Vahi is a village in Harku Parish, Harju County in northern Estonia. It has a population of 81 (as of 1 June 2010).

Gallery

References

Villages in Harju County